"2 Reasons" is a song by American R&B singer Trey Songz, featuring vocals from American rapper T.I. It was released in the United States on June 12, 2012. The song serves as the second single from his fifth studio album, Chapter V (2012). It was featured on the 2013 film Texas Chainsaw 3D, which is also starring Songz.

Music video
The video was filmed in April 2012 in Atlanta, Georgia and directed by Benny Boom. The video was premiered on June 12, 2012 on BET's 106 & Park. This was the beginning of the Santiago Era for Trey Songz.

Track listing

Chart performance

Weekly charts

Year-end charts

Certifications

Release history

See also
List of Billboard Rhythmic number-one songs of the 2010s

References

2012 singles
Trey Songz songs
T.I. songs
Songs written by T.I.
Music videos directed by Benny Boom
Songs written by Trey Songz
2012 songs
Atlantic Records singles
Song recordings produced by Troy Taylor (record producer)
Songs written by Troy Taylor (record producer)